Hannes Wagner is a German Greco-Roman wrestler. He is a two-time bronze medalist at the European Wrestling Championships.

Career 

He lost his bronze medal match in the 82 kg event at the 2019 European Wrestling Championships held in Bucharest, Romania.

In 2020, he won one of the bronze medals in the 82 kg event at the European Wrestling Championships held in Rome, Italy.

In January 2021, he won the silver medal in the 82 kg event at the 2021 Grand Prix Zagreb Open held in Zagreb, Croatia. In April 2021, he also won one of the bronze medals in the 82 kg event at the European Wrestling Championships held in Warsaw, Poland.

He competed in the 87kg event at the 2022 World Wrestling Championships held in Belgrade, Serbia.

Achievements

References

External links 
 

Living people
Year of birth missing (living people)
Place of birth missing (living people)
German male sport wrestlers
European Wrestling Championships medalists
21st-century German people